Harry Blackstone may refer to:

Harry Blackstone Sr. (1885–1965), American magician known as "The Great Blackstone" and father of Harry Blackstone, Jr.
Harry Blackstone Jr. (1934–1997), American stage magician and television performer of the late 20th century

See also 
 Harry Blackstone Copperfield Dresden, fictional detective and magician